Lauren Hutton-Townsend (born 10 November 1990) is a footballer who plays as a defender for the Wales national team and Cardiff City LFC. Townsend won 20 caps for Wales at under-19 level. She made her senior debut on 30 January 2008; a 1–1 friendly draw with Portugal in Mafra, Portugal.

References

External links
 
 
 

1990 births
Living people
Yeovil Town L.F.C. players
Bristol Academy W.F.C. players
Wales women's international footballers
Welsh women's footballers
Women's Super League players
Cardiff City Ladies F.C. players
FA Women's National League players
Cardiff Met. Ladies F.C. players
Women's association football defenders